The Morrison Public School District is located in Morrison, Oklahoma, United States. The Morrison school district has three schools.

The district is managed by the Superintendent Brent Haken, who works under the direction of a five-person board. Before becoming the superintendent of Morrison Public Schools, Haken was a teacher at Stillwater Public Schools.

The mascot of both the district and the high school is the Wildcat.

Schools

High school
 Morrison High School (Grades 9-12)

Middle school
 Morrison Middle School (Grades 7-8)

Elementary school
 Morrison Elementary School (Grades PK-6)

References

External links
 

School districts in Oklahoma
Education in Noble County, Oklahoma